Anthony De Ceglie is an Australian journalist who has served as the editor-in-chief of West Australian Newspapers (including The West Australian) since January 2019. Prior to entering the position, De Ceglie served as the deputy editor of the Sydney-based Daily Telegraph from March 2016, as well as serving as Deputy Editor at the Sunday Times and its web portal PerthNow before becoming the editor of WAN. His first job in journalism was at The Collie Mail in the rural town of Collie, Western Australia. 

From March 2020 to 2021, during his tenure, it increased its weekday readership by 14%, and its Sunday readership by 28%, though some have argued that it has gone in a more tabloid direction under his leadership, and the staff has been reduced.

Awards and accolades  

In 2020, De Ceglie won a Walkley Award for Headline, Caption or Hook, in the category of all media, for his "You only had one JobKeeper" line. Prior to this, he had already received two Walkleys. Additionally, he serves as a trustee of the Channel 7 Telethon trust, a charitable organisation owned by Seven West Media (which also in turn owns WAN).

References 

Living people
Australian newspaper editors
Year of birth missing (living people)
The West Australian